Pain Shad Deh (also Romanized as Pā’īn Shād Deh; also known as Pā’īn Shādeh, Shādeh, and Shady) is a village in Lafmejan Rural District, in the Central District of Lahijan County, Gilan Province, Iran. At the 2006 census, its population was 282, in 110 families.

References 

Populated places in Lahijan County